Oskar Paprzycki (born 31 July 1998) is a Polish professional footballer who plays as a midfielder for Odra Opole.

Biography

Paprzycki started playing in the youth sides of Beniaminek 03 Starogard Gdański, KP Starogard Gdański, and AP Lechia Gdańsk, before joining the Lechia Gdańsk academy. Between 2015 and 2016 Paprzycki played with the Lechia Gdańsk II team in the III liga.

Paprzycki started his professional career in 2016 when he joined Kotwica Kołobrzeg, spending the season with the II liga club, making 24 league appearances in the process. The following season Paprzycki joined I liga side Chojniczanka Chojnice, with whom he spent three seasons with, making 69 appearances and scoring 3 goals during his stint at the club. In 2020 Paprzycki joined GKS Tychy after Chojniczanka suffered relegation to the II liga.

On 14 June 2022, he moved to another I liga side Odra Opole on a free transfer.

References

1998 births
Lechia Gdańsk II players
Kotwica Kołobrzeg footballers
Chojniczanka Chojnice players
GKS Tychy players
Odra Opole players
I liga players
II liga players
III liga players
Polish footballers
Association football midfielders
Living people
Sportspeople from Gdańsk